Evan Davies or Davis may refer to:

British
 Evan Davies (missionary) (1805–1864), Welsh Protestant Christian missionary
 Evan Tom Davies (1904–1973), Welsh mathematician
 Mervyn Davies, Baron Davies of Abersoch (born 1952), Chairman of Standard Chartered
 Evan Davies (rugby), rugby union and rugby league footballer of the 1910s and 1920s
 Evan Davies (Ebbw Vale MP) (1875–1960), Welsh Member of Parliament for Ebbw Vale, 1920–1929
 Ianto Davies (1892–1946), Wales international rugby union player
 Evan Davis (born 1962), British economist, journalist and presenter for the BBC
 Evan Davies (educationalist) (1826–1872), Welsh educationalist
 Evan Davies (Calvinistic Methodist minister) (1842–1919), Welsh Calvinistic Methodist minister, and writer
 Evan Davies (Independent minister) (1750–1806), Welsh Independent minister
 Evan Davies (almanac-maker) (fl. 1720–1750), Welsh philomath and almanac-maker
 Evan Thomas Davies (musician) (1847–1927), Welsh musician
 Evan Thomas Davies (cleric) (1847–1927), Welsh priest

American
Evan G. Davies (1877–1967), American politician
 Evan A. Davis (c. 1944), New York City attorney
 Evan "Funk" Davies (born 1960), American musician and DJ
 Evan Davies, cinematographer and film producer

Australian
 Evan Davies (New South Wales politician) (1889–1948), Australian politician born in Wales
 Evan Davies (Western Australian politician) (1892–1963), Australian politician